Olympic Broadcasting Services S.L. (OBS) is a company which was established by the International Olympic Committee in 2001 in order to serve as the Host Broadcaster organisation for all Olympic Games, Paralympic Games, Olympic Winter Games and Youth Olympic Games, maintaining the standards of Olympic broadcasting between one edition and the next one. Headquartered in Madrid, Spain, the company operates as a subsidiary of Olympic Broadcasting Services S.A. (Lausanne, Switzerland), which is owned by the International Olympic Committee through the Olympic Foundation.

Functions

As Host Broadcaster, OBS is responsible for delivering the pictures and sounds of the Olympic and Paralympic Games to billions of viewers around the world. It produces and transmits unbiased live radio and television coverage of every sport from every venue. This feed is called the International Signal or the World Feed and is distributed as a service to all broadcast organisations who have purchased the television and radio rights to the Games (known as Rights Holding Broadcasters or RHBs).

In collaboration with the Local Organising Committee, OBS supervises the development of the necessary infrastructures (including the International Broadcast Centre (IBC) which serves as the primary base of the broadcast operation for OBS and the RHBs during the Games) and facilities at the different Olympic venues to ensure the successful broadcast production of the Games. OBS also offers additional services, equipment and supplies to the RHBs to help them produce their unilateral production.

History
The 2008 Summer Olympics in Beijing marked the first time OBS was involved as Host Broadcaster. Previously the host broadcaster role was delegated to the local organising committees or to third-party broadcasters, having to rebuild the broadcast operation in each edition.

Beijing 2008

Its operations began with the 2008 Summer Olympics in Beijing, where Beijing Olympic Broadcasting, a joint venture between OBS and the Beijing Organizing Committee for the Olympic Games, acted as the host broadcasting consortium and the state television network, China Central Television which is one of the host nation broadcasters of the games.

Vancouver 2010
For the 2010 Winter Olympics in Vancouver, a wholly owned division, Olympic Broadcasting Services Vancouver was set up. The 2010 Olympics marked the first Games where the host broadcasting facilities were provided solely by OBS.

London 2012
The 2012 Olympic Games were broadcast by OBS. More than 5,600+ hours of live sports, ceremonies and Olympic News Channel content were distributed to the Rights Holding Broadcasters. OBS employed 1,000+ HD cameras, including 40 High Super Slow Motion cameras and other innovative specialty equipment such as 3D cameras, Super High Vision cameras and the world's longest cablecam which stretched 2,340m at the Rowing venue from start to finish.

Sochi 2014
The Sochi 2014 Olympic Winter Games represented the largest broadcast operation in history for a Winter Games. OBS deployed more than 450 cameras, including 12 cablecam systems, 31 High Speed Slow Motion (HSSM) cameras and a multicopter/drone used for the first time, to ultimately produce 1300+ hours of television.

In total, 464 television channels broadcast the Sochi Games, almost double the number from Vancouver, and more digital platforms offered coverage than at any previous Winter Games with 155 websites and 75 apps showing events live from Russia.

Thanks to the increased number of channels and digital platforms for Sochi 2014, there were more hours broadcast globally than any previous Winter Games with more than 100,000 hours broadcast around the world, compared with 57,000 for Vancouver 2010.

For the first time in Olympic history, the amount of digital coverage exceeded traditional television broadcasts with 60,000 hours available on digital platforms, compared with 42,000 hours on television. These were the first predominantly digital Olympic Games and OBS helped fuel the significant increase in digital coverage by launching, for the first time in Sochi, the Olympic Video Player (OVP). Available in 95 countries, the OVP provided a fully integrated data, a news channel, live streams and on-demand video.

Rio 2016
Rio 2016 represented the most television coverage of any previous Olympic Games, with nearly 350,000 total hours broadcast globally, far exceeding the 200,000 hours that were broadcast for the London 2012 Games. Additionally, coverage was aired across more platforms than ever before, as more than 500 television channels and 250 digital outlets conveyed the Olympic Games around the world.

The number of hours of coverage available on digital platforms nearly doubled that of traditional television, representing more than two and a half times of what was achieved for London 2012 (218,000 hours versus 81,500 hours), marking a milestone in the history of Olympic broadcasting.

Representing the largest host broadcast operation to date, Rio involved more than 7,200 OBS personnel. Further, having developed a production plan to cover all 28 Olympic sports, including new additions Golf and Rugby Sevens, OBS drew on more than 1,000 cameras for the coverage of the Rio Games.

Rio also marked the first time Olympic content was available in Virtual Reality (VR). Overall, OBS produced more than 85 hours of live VR coverage, captured by custom-developed 360-degree camera systems, to a total of 14 RHB organisations, representing 31 territories.

OBS and Japanese Rights Holder NHK continued their collaboration on 4K/8K Super Hi-Vision (SHV) technology and produced approximately 100 hours of live coverage for Rio, featuring 22.2-channel surround sound.

Pyeongchang 2018 
Pyeongchang 2018 Winter Olympics and Paralympic cameras provided by Panasonic.

Tokyo 2020

Beijing 2022

Previous logos

References

External links

 

International Olympic Committee
International broadcasting
Olympics on television